The Crown Court (Recording and Broadcasting) Order 2020 is a statutory instrument of the Parliament of the United Kingdom. The order allows for the filming of the sentencing phase of trials held at the Crown Court in England and Wales. The filming of criminal proceedings was given approval in 2020, but implementation was delayed until 2022 because of the onset of the COVID-19 pandemic.

Background
The recording of sound or images in English courts had been banned since 1925. In 2013, it was relaxed and certain Court of Appeal cases were allowed to be recorded or filmed. Since 2018, some cases had been streamed online.

Several media organisations, including BBC News, ITN and Sky News had campaigned to have the law relaxed for over 20 years. A representative from the Ministry of Justice said they hoped a public assessment of judge's decisions would allow the public to understand them in more depth. However, some barristers raised concerns that this could allow the court to become a "spectator sport". The act was first used for the sentencing of Ben Oliver for manslaughter in June 2022.

Applicable cases
The act only allows filming and broadcasting of the sentencing in a court case. It is still illegal to film or broadcast any other part of the case, including testimonies by witnesses, victims or jurors.

References

2020 in British law
2022 in British law
Statutory Instruments of the United Kingdom
2022 in British television